Limacinula tenuis is a plant pathogen infecting bananas.

References

External links 
 Index Fungorum
 USDA ARS Fungal Database

Fungal plant pathogens and diseases
Banana diseases
Capnodiales
Fungi described in 1913